Longsight railway station was built by the Manchester & Birmingham Railway Company (MBR).

History

The first station in the area was called Rushford which opened with the line in 1840. It closed in 1843 and was replaced with Longsight.

The station opened in April 1843, and became very important to the early success of Belle Vue Zoo as it was close enough to be a drop-off point for organised excursions. A special platform, some 1,500 feet (457 metres) in length was constructed for these trains, much of which can still be seen among the depot sidings. The station closed on 15 September 1958, and very little is left of it today. A short platform has been built on part of the former station site for use of railway staff travelling to and from the adjacent carriage depot.

References

Further reading

External links
Longsight Station on navigable 1948 O.S. map

Disused railway stations in Manchester
Former London and North Western Railway stations
Railway stations in Great Britain opened in 1843
Railway stations in Great Britain closed in 1958
1843 establishments in England